Lea Schüpbach (born 10 September 1997) is a Swiss handballer who plays for TuS Metzingen and the Switzerland women's national team.

Achievements
SPAR Premium League:
Winner: 2016, 2018
Schweizer Cupsieger:
Winner: 2013, 2018, 2019

References
 

  
1997 births
Living people
Sportspeople from Zürich
Swiss female handball players
Expatriate handball players
Swiss expatriate sportspeople in Germany
Swiss expatriate sportspeople in France